The common green racer (Chlorosoma viridissimum) is a species of venomous snake of the family Colubridae.

Geographic range
The snake is found in South America.

References 

 https://serpientesdevenezuela.org/philodryas-viridissima/

Reptiles described in 1758
Taxa named by Carl Linnaeus
Chlorosoma
Snakes of South America
Reptiles of Bolivia
Reptiles of Brazil
Reptiles of Colombia
Reptiles of Ecuador
Reptiles of French Guiana
Reptiles of Guyana
Reptiles of Peru
Reptiles of Suriname
Reptiles of Venezuela
Taxobox binomials not recognized by IUCN